Griffiss Air Force Base is a former United States Air Force installation in the northeastern United States, located in Central New York state at Rome, about  northwest of Utica.

Missions included fighter interceptors, electronic research, installation, and support activities, aerial refueling, and bombers.  Opened in 1942, the base closed pursuant to BRAC action in 1995 and its airfield is now Griffiss International Airport, owned by Oneida County. In November, 1984 the site was added to the National Priorities List because hazardous chemicals were found in soil and ground water. Solvents, lead and polychlorinated biphenyls (PCBs) had been disposed in landfills and dry wells.

Closed in September, 1995 by the Base Realignment and Closure Commission decision, it was realigned for civilian and non-combat purposes in 1995, and is now home to the Griffiss Business and Technology Park.  Post-closure, two USAF activities remained: the Rome Research Site of the Air Force Research Laboratory, and the Eastern Air Defense Sector (EADS) of the North American Aerospace Defense Command (NORAD) as operated by the New York Air National Guard from a small complex of buildings in the Technology Park.

Griffiss was the site of the Woodstock '99 Festival in July, 1999. Notorious for overpricing, triple-digit heat, aggressive music and lack of water, it descended into chaos, although no base assets

Location, geography
Griffiss Air Force Base is located in central New York state at Rome, in the Mohawk Valley, among the Mohawk River, Six Mile Creek and the New York State Barge Canal.

History
On 3 April 1941, the War Department began looking for an area to construct an air depot in central New York. Orders to begin construction came from the War Department on 23 June 1941 and ground was broken on 2 August 1941.  Facilities were completed in February, 1942, and flight operations on the depot airfield began on 18 February 1942. Construction had been supervised by Kenneth Nichols of the United States Army Corps of Engineers Syracuse Engineer District, which was headed by James C. Marshall. Marshall and then Nichols became District Engineer for the Manhattan Engineer District (MED) which built the atomic bomb.

After a series of names and realignments, the base was finally named "Griffiss Air Force Base" in 1948 to honor Lt. Col. Townsend Griffiss (1900–1942): a Buffalo native and 1922 West Point graduate. In 1942, Griffiss became the first U.S. airman to be killed in the line of duty in the European Theatre of World War II when the B-24 Liberator bomber he was aboard was shot down by friendly fire over the English Channel. The USAF had originally applied "Griffiss Air Force Base" to Fort Worth Army Airfield in Texas on 1 January 1948, but its name was changed on 27 February to memorialize native son and Medal of Honor recipient, Major Horace Carswell, who gave his life while attempting to crash-land his crippled B-24 over China.

Rome Air Depot
On 1 February 1942, the Rome Air Depot was activated and throughout World War II the depot provided aircraft engine maintenance and repair, and trained air depot groups in engine repair. With the end of the war and the sharp reduction of AAF aircraft operations, activities were sharply curtailed in the fall of 1945. The Rome Air Depot continued operations well into the 1960s as an Air Force Logistics Command Air Materiel Area (AMA), supporting USAF electronics and radar systems. The depot began a phasedown in the early 1960s, with the depot closing in 1967 and its functions being transferred to other AFLC Air Materiel Areas.

Air Defense

Although many aircraft landed at Griffiss during the war, the airfield had no permanently-stationed flying units. It wasn't until after World War II that the Air Force Reserve 65th Reconnaissance Group conducted aerial photo and mapping operations from Griffiss, from 27 December 1946 until being inactivated on 27 June 1949.

On 3 October 1950, the 1st Fighter-Interceptor Group of Air Defense Command (ADC) became the first permanently-assigned USAF flying unit at Griffiss. Although the group moved to California in 1951, its 27th Fighter-Interceptor Squadron (FIS) remained behind.  ADC units were stationed there for the next 30 years, as Griffiss became a center for the Northeast air defense mission and was the headquarters of the Northeast Air Defense Sector. The 27th FIS flew Lockheed F-80 Shooting Stars, North American F-86 Sabres, Northrop F-89 Scorpion,  Lockheed F-94 Starfires and Convair F-102 Delta Daggers before leaving Griffiss in 1959.

In October, 1955, the 465th FIS was assigned to Griffiss with F-89 Scorpion all-weather fighters. ADC activated the 4727th Air Defense Group as a headquarters for the two squadrons in February, 1957, and it became a major tenant at Griffiss.  The 49th FIS moved—less personnel, equipment and aircraft—from Hanscom AFB, Massachusetts and replaced the 465th FIS in October, 1959, receiving, after the transfer, its McDonnell F-101 Voodoos.  Later that year, when the 27th FIS departed Griffiss, the 4727th was discontinued.

Rome Laboratory

Electronic research began at the Rome Air Depot in 1949. The Watson Laboratory complex was transferred to Rome from Red Bank New Jersey between 1950 and 1951. The Rome Air Development Center was begun at the base on 12 June 1951, as a response to the specific electronics needs of air forces learned by the U.S. Army Signal Corps during the war. The RADC would be renamed to Rome Laboratory in 1991, as a response to its changing role in research and development.

Strategic Air Command

The 416th Bombardment Wing (416 BW), a Strategic Air Command (SAC) B-52G Stratofortress and KC-135R Stratotanker wing that conducted strategic bombardment readiness, conventional bombardment operations and air refueling operations on a global scale, was based at Griffiss AFB. 416 BW crews and aircraft deployed to the Pacific during the Vietnam War era to support SAC operations during the conflict. In 1991, wing crews and aircraft participated in Operation Desert Storm, the first Gulf War in Southwest Asia.

 SR-71 Mach 3.2 Reconnaissance "spy plane" supersonic jet visit

In 1986, prior to the US/NATO bombing of Libya, an SR-71 Mach 3.2 supersonic reconnaisssnce "spy plane" left California's Beale Air Force Base and, using multiple KC-135 midair refuelings plus a Griffiss land refueling each way, did the approximately 12,000-mile round-trip in less than half a day.

On 1 June 1992, as part of an Air Force-wide reorganization and concurrent with the disestablishment of SAC, the 416 BW's KC-135 aircraft were transferred to the newly established Air Mobility Command (AMC).  The 416th retained its B-52 aircraft and the wing was transferred to the newly established Air Combat Command (ACC), with Griffiss designated as an ACC base.  The 416 BW was inactivated in 1995 as part of another post-Cold War drawdown of United States strategic forces pursuant to a 1993 BRAC decision.  Closure of Griffiss AFB was part of this same BRAC action.

Among the tenant activities at Griffiss AFB, the base was also home to the aviation brigade of the U.S. Army's 10th Mountain Division from 1988 to 1992.

BRAC Realignment
Griffiss AFB was selected for realignment by the Base Realignment and Closure Commission in 1993.

The facility is now home to the Griffiss Business and Technology Park, and is still home to the Rome Research Site of the Air Force Research Lab as well as the Eastern Air Defense Sector (EADS) of North American Air Defense Command (NORAD) and the Defense Finance and Accounting Service (DFAS) Rome Location.

At its peak, the base was the largest employer in Oneida County, New York.
Griffiss was the site of the Woodstock 1999

Environmental contamination
The base was designated a superfund site in 1984. Solvents, lead and polychlorinated biphenyls (PCBs) had been disposed in landfills and dry wells. This contaminated Three Mile Creek and Sixmile Creek, and ground water beneath portions of the base, and led to accumulation of volatile organic compounds (VOCs). Leaking underground storage tanks and soil contamination were dug out. People affected by contaminated well water received bottled water until, in 1991, everyone was connected to the municipal water supply. 
By 2013, 27 of the 31 "areas of concern" identified in 1995 had been cleaned up or addressed otherwise, and did not need "further action" per EPA.

Redevelopment
The base closure on 30 September 1995 meant that 5,000 jobs or 30 percent of the city's economic base were lost. The population decreased by almost 10,000, from 44,350 in 1990 to 34,950 in 2000. In 2004, a new $24 million facility opened.

Major commands

 USAAF Materiel Div, 1 February 1942 (rdsgd Materiel Comd, 16 March 1942)
 USAAF Materiel and Services, 17 July 1944 (rdsgd AAF Technical Service Comd, 31 August 1944
 Air Technical Service Command, 1 July 1945
 Air Materiel Command, 9 March 1946)
 Air Research and Development Command, 2 April 1951
 Air Materiel Command, 1 July 1954
 Redesignated: Air Force Logistics Command, 1 April 1961
 Strategic Air Command, 1 July 1970 – 1 June 1992
 Air Combat Command, 1 June 1992 – 30 September 1995
 Air Force Materiel Command, 1 October 1995–present

Major units assigned

 Rome Air Depot, 1 February 1942 – 3 January 1955
 Rome Air Material Area, 1 February 1943 – 25 June 1947
 4104th Army Air Force Base Unit, 1 April 1944 – 15 April 1945
 65th Reconnaissance Group, 27 December 1946 – 27 June 1949
 1st Fighter-Interceptor Group, 15 August 1950 – 3 June 1951
 71st Fighter-Interceptor Squadron, 15 August – 21 October 1950
 27th Fighter-Interceptor Squadron, 15 August 1950 – 1 October 1959
 6530th Air Base Wing, 12 June 1951 – 1 August 1952
 Rome Air Force Depot, 3 January 1955 – 1 April 1967
 465th Fighter-Interceptor Squadron, 8 October 1955 – 1 July 1959
 2856th Air Base Wing, 16 February 1958 – 1 July 1970
 4727th Air Defense Group, 8 February 1957 – 15 October 1959
 49th Fighter-Interceptor Squadron, 1 July 1959 – 7 July 1987
 4039th Strategic Wing, 1 August 1958 – 1 February 1963
 41st Air Refueling Squadron, 5 January 1959 – 1992
 416th Bombardment Wing, 1 February 1963 – 1995
 485th Electronic Installation Squadron (later 485th Communications Installation Group, 485th Engineering Installation Group) January 1972 - 1995
 21st Air Division, 31 August – 23 September 1983
 24th Air Division, 1 December 1983 – 30 September 1990
 509th Air Refueling Squadron, 1 July 1990 – 1 October 1994
 Northern Communications Area of the Air Force Communications Service, 1 May 1970 – 1 June 1981
 2019th Airways & Air Communications Service Squadron (later 2019th Communications Squadron), 1 November 1954 – 31 July 1977
 2019th Communications Squadron (Later the 2019th Information Systems Squadron, 2019th Communications Squadron, 416th Communications Squadron), 1 July 1980 – 30 June 1995

References

Further reading

 Ravenstein, Charles A. Air Force Combat Wings Lineage and Honors Histories 1947–1977. Maxwell Air Force Base, Alabama: Office of Air Force History 1984. .
 Mueller, Robert (1989). Volume 1: Active Air Force Bases Within the United States of America on 17 September 1982.
 Aerospace Defense Command publication, The Interceptor, January 1979 (Volume 21, Number 1).

Installations of the United States Air Force in New York (state)
1942 establishments in New York (state)
Installations of Strategic Air Command
Buildings and structures in Oneida County, New York
Military Superfund sites
Airfields of the United States Army Air Forces Technical Service Command
Defunct airports in New York (state)
Superfund sites in New York (state)
Rome, New York
1995 disestablishments in New York (state)
Transportation buildings and structures in Oneida County, New York
Military installations closed in 1995